Wendy Hale (born November 3, 1987) is a Solomon Islands weightlifter.

She won a silver medal and a bronze at the Commonwealth Youth Games in 2004, two silver medals at the Mini South Pacific Games in 2005, four gold medals at the Arafura Games in 2007, and two silver medals at the South Pacific Games in 2007.

Hale represented the Solomon Islands at the 2008 Summer Olympics in Beijing. She was her country's flagbearer during the opening ceremony.
In the Olympic tournament she ranked 12th in the 58 kg category, with a total of 173 kg. In 2016 after the silver medalist Russian Marina Shainova disqualified, she stepped up to the eleventh place.

Major results

References

External links
 

 Athlete Biography at beijing2008

1987 births
Living people
Solomon Islands female weightlifters
Olympic weightlifters of the Solomon Islands
Weightlifters at the 2008 Summer Olympics
Weightlifters at the 2006 Commonwealth Games
Commonwealth Games competitors for the Solomon Islands